Finlay Graham (born 24 September 1999) is a British racing cyclist who competes in para-cycling road and track events. He competed at the 2020 Summer Paralympics, winning the silver medal in the men's individual pursuit C3.

References

1999 births
Living people
British male cyclists
Paralympic cyclists of Great Britain
Cyclists at the 2020 Summer Paralympics
Medalists at the 2020 Summer Paralympics
20th-century British people
21st-century British people